A list of films produced in Argentina in 1989:

1989

External links and references
 Argentine films of 1989 at the Internet Movie Database

1989
Argentine
Films